James J. Kennedy (10 March 1909 – 13 September 1968) was an Irish Fianna Fáil politician and farmer. He was a member of Dáil Éireann for one term, from his election as a Teachta Dála (TD) for the Wexford constituency at the 1965 general election until his death in 1968. He was also a chairman of Wexford County Council. There was no subsequent by-election as the 1969 general election took place the following June.

References

1909 births
1968 deaths
Fianna Fáil TDs
Members of the 18th Dáil
Irish farmers
Politicians from County Wexford